The Judicial Service Commission (JSC) of Sri Lanka is established under Article 112 of the Constitution of Sri Lanka. The first commission was established in 1947.

Role
The Key functions of the JSC are:

Appointment, transfer, dismissal and disciplinary control of judicial officers (District Judges and Magistrates).
Appointment of scheduled public officers (registrar of the supreme court, fiscal, etc.).

Membership
The commission is made up of the Chief Justice who is the Chairman, and two Judges of the Supreme Court of Sri Lanka appointed by the President of the Republic. Current membership of the JSC is as follows:

 Justice Jayantha Jayasuriya (C.J) - Chairman/Chief Justice
 Justice Bhuwaneka Aluwihare - Judge of the Supreme Court
 Justice Sisira de Abrew - Judge of the Supreme Court

References

External links
 Judicial Service Commission of Sri Lanka

Law of Sri Lanka
Statutory boards of Sri Lanka
Judiciary of Sri Lanka